The 2022 World Under-17 Hockey Challenge was an ice hockey tournament that was held in Langley and Delta, British Columbia, Canada from November 3 to 12, 2022. It was the 29th edition of the tournament and first since 2019.

Venues
On May 11, 2022, Hockey Canada announced Langley and Delta, British Columbia as the tournament hosts.

Preliminary round
All listed times are local (UTC-8).

Playoff round

Bronze-medal game

Gold-medal game

Statistics

Scoring leaders

GP = Games played; G = Goals; A = Assists; Pts = Points; PIM = Penalties In MinutesSource: Hockey Canada

Goaltending leaders

(minimum 40% team's total ice time)

TOI = Time on ice (minutes:seconds); GA = Goals against; GAA = Goals against average; SA = Shots against; Sv% = Save percentage; SO = ShutoutsSource: Hockey Canada

Final standings

Awards
Tournament All-Star Team:
Goaltender: -R Gabriel D’Aigle
Defencemen: -B Sam Dickinson / -W Henry Mews
Forwards: -R Berkly Catton /  Cole Eiserman /  James Hagens
Source: Hockey Canada

References

External links

World U-17
World U-17
Delta, British Columbia
Langley, British Columbia (district municipality)
World U-17 Hockey Challenge